is the son of the current Aikido Dōshu, Moriteru Ueshiba. In keeping with the iemoto system, he is expected to succeed his father as Dōshu. He is the great-grandson of Morihei Ueshiba, the Aikido founder.

From April 2012, Ueshiba is Dojocho of the Aikikai Hombu Dojo, and as such is referred to as Waka-sensei (若先生, "young master"). This term was applied to Moriteru Ueshiba when the second Dōshu Kisshomaru Ueshiba was still alive, and to Kisshomaru when the founder was still alive. More than simply a title of respect, it is intended to refer to the successor, who will take on leadership after his father.

Personal life
On March 2, 2008, Mitsuteru Ueshiba married Keiko Kusano.

References

External links
Photo of father and son
Mitsuteru Ueshiba　－　47th All Japan Aikido YouTube
Mitsuteru Ueshiba - Aikijinja Taisai 2010

Japanese aikidoka
Living people
1980 births